The Norns are deities in Norse mythology responsible for shaping the course of human destinies.

In the Völuspá, the three primary Norns Urðr (Wyrd), Verðandi, and Skuld draw water from their sacred well to nourish the tree at the center of the cosmos and prevent it from rot. These three Norns are described as powerful maiden giantesses (Jotuns) whose arrival from Jötunheimr ended the golden age of the gods. The Norns are also described as maidens of Mögþrasir in the Vafþrúðnismál.

Beside the three Norns tending Yggdrasill, pre-Christian Scandinavians attested to Norns who visit a newborn child in order to determine the person's future. These Norns could be malevolent or benevolent: the former causing tragic events in the world while the latter were kind and protective.

Etymology
The origin of the name norn is uncertain; it may derive from a word meaning "to twine" and which would refer to their twining the thread of fate. Bek-Pedersen suggests that the word norn has relation to the Swedish dialect word norna (nyrna), a verb that means "secretly communicate". This relates to the perception of norns as shadowy, background figures who only really ever reveal their fateful secrets to people as their fates come to pass.

The name Urðr (Old English Wyrd, Weird) means "fate". Wyrd and urðr are etymological cognates, which does not guarantee that wyrd and urðr share the same semantic quality of "fate" over time.  Both Urðr and Verðandi are derived from the Old Norse verb verða, "to become", which itself derives from Proto-Germanic *wurdiz, from Proto-Indo-European *wrti-, a verbal abstract from the root *wert- (“to turn”) It is commonly asserted that while Urðr derives from the past tense ("that which became or happened"), Verðandi derives from the present tense of verða ("that which is happening"). Skuld is derived from the Old Norse verb skulu, "need/ought to be/shall be"; its meaning is "that which should become, or that needs to occur". Due to this, it has often been inferred that the three norns are in some way connected with the past, present and future respectively, but it has been disputed that their names really imply a temporal distinction and it has been emphasised that the words do not in themselves denote chronological periods in Old Norse.

Relation to other Germanic female deities

There is no clear distinction between norns, fylgjas, hamingjas, and valkyries, nor with the generic term dísir. Moreover, artistic license permitted such terms to be used for mortal women in Old Norse poetry. To quote Snorri Sturluson's Skáldskaparmál on the various names used for women:
Woman is also metaphorically called by the names of the Asynjur or the Valkyrs or Norns or women of supernatural kind.
These unclear distinctions among norns and other Germanic female deities are discussed in Bek-Pedersen's book Norns in Old Norse Mythology.

Attestations

There are a number of surviving Old Norse sources that relate to the norns. The most important sources are the Prose Edda and the Poetic Edda. The latter contains pagan poetry where the norns are frequently referred to, while the former contains, in addition to pagan poetry, retellings, descriptions and commentaries by the 12th and 13th century Icelandic chieftain and scholar Snorri Sturluson.

Skaldic poetry
A skaldic reference to the norns appears in Hvini's poem in Ynglingatal 24 found in Ynglingasaga 47, where King Halfdan is put to rest by his men at Borró. This reference brings in the phrase "norna dómr" which means "judgment of the nornir". In most cases, when the norns pass judgment, it means death to those who have been judged - in this case, Halfdan. Along with being associated with being bringers of death, Bek-Pedersen suggests that this phrase brings in a quasi-legal aspect to the nature of the norns. This legal association is employed quite frequently within skaldic and eddic sources. This phrase can also be seen as a threat, as death is the final and inevitable decision that the norns can make with regard to human life.

Poetic Edda
The Poetic Edda is valuable in representing older material in poetry from which Snorri tapped information in the Prose Edda. Like Gylfaginning, the Poetic Edda mentions the existence of many lesser norns beside the three main norns.  Moreover, it also agrees with Gylfaginning by telling that they were of several races and that the dwarven norns were the daughters of Dvalin. It also suggests that the three main norns were giantesses (female Jotuns).

Fáfnismál contains a discussion between the hero Sigurd and the dragon Fafnir who is dying from a mortal wound from Sigurd. The hero asks Fafnir of many things, among them the nature of the norns. Fafnir explains that they are many and from several races:

It appears from Völuspá and Vafþrúðnismál that the three main norns were not originally goddesses but giants (Jotuns), and that their arrival ended the early days of bliss for the gods, but that they come for the good of humankind.

Völuspá relates that three giants of huge might are reported to have arrived to the gods from Jotunheim:

Vafþrúðnismál probably refers to the norns when it talks of maiden giants who arrive to protect the people of earth as protective spirits (hamingjas):

The Völuspá contains the names of the three main Norns referring to them as maidens like Vafþrúðnismál probably does:

Helgakviða Hundingsbana I

The norns visited each newly born child to allot his or her future, and in Helgakviða Hundingsbana I, the hero Helgi Hundingsbane has just been born and norns arrive at the homestead:

Helgakviða Hundingsbana II
In Helgakviða Hundingsbana II, Helgi Hundingsbane blames the norns for the fact that he had to kill Sigrún's father Högni and brother Bragi in order to wed her:

Reginsmál
Like Snorri Sturluson stated in Gylfaginning, people's fate depended on the benevolence or the malevolence of particular norns. In Reginsmál, the water dwelling dwarf Andvari blames his plight on an evil norn, presumably one of the daughters of Dvalin:

Sigurðarkviða hin skamma
Another instance of Norns being blamed for an undesirable situation appears in Sigurðarkviða hin skamma, where the valkyrie Brynhild blames malevolent norns for her long yearning for the embrace of Sigurd:

Guðrúnarkviða II

Brynhild's solution was to have Gunnarr and his brothers, the lords of the Burgundians, kill Sigurd and afterwards to commit suicide in order to join Sigurd in the afterlife. Her brother Atli (Attila the Hun) avenged her death by killing the lords of the Burgundians, but since he was married to their sister Guðrún, Atli would soon be killed by her. In Guðrúnarkviða II, the Norns actively enter the series of events by informing Atli in a dream that his wife would kill him. The description of the dream begins with this stanza:

Guðrúnarhvöt
After having killed both her husband Atli and their sons, Guðrún blames the Norns for her misfortunes, as in Guðrúnarhvöt, where Guðrún talks of trying to escaping the wrath of the norns by trying to kill herself:

Hamðismál

Guðrúnarhvöt deals with how Guðrún incited her sons to avenge the cruel death of their sister Svanhild. In Hamðismál, her sons' expedition to the Gothic king Ermanaric to exact vengeance is fateful. Knowing that he is about to die at the hands of the Goths, her son Sörli talks of the cruelty of the norns:

Sigrdrífumál

Since the norns were beings of ultimate power who were working in the dark, it should be no surprise that they could be referred to in charms, as they are by Sigrdrífa in Sigrdrífumál:

Prose Edda
In the part of Snorri Sturluson's Prose Edda which is called Gylfaginning, Gylfi, the king of Sweden, has arrived at Valhalla calling himself Gangleri. There, he receives an education in Norse mythology from what is Odin in the shape of three men. They explain to Gylfi that there are three main norns, but also many others of various races, æsir, elves and dwarves:

A hall stands there, fair, under the ash by the well, and out of that hall come three maids, who are called thus: Urdr, Verdandi, Skuld; these maids determine the period of men's lives: we call them Norns; but there are many norns: those who come to each child that is born, to appoint his life; these are of the race of the gods, but the second are of the Elf-people, and the third are of the kindred of the dwarves, as it is said here:

Most sundered in birth
I say the Norns are;
They claim no common kin:
Some are of Æsir-kin,
some are of Elf-kind,
Some are Dvalinn's daughters.

Then said Gangleri: "If the Norns determine the weirds of men, then they apportion exceeding unevenly, seeing that some have a pleasant and luxurious life, but others have little worldly goods or fame; some have long life, others short." Hárr said: "Good norns and of honorable race appoint good life; but those men that suffer evil fortunes are governed by evil norns."

The three main norns take water out of the well of Urd and water Yggdrasil:

It is further said that these Norns who dwell by the Well of Urdr take water of the well every day, and with it that clay which lies about the well, and sprinkle it over the Ash, to the end that its limbs shall not wither nor rot; for that water is so holy that all things which come there into the well become as white as the film which lies within the egg-shell,--as is here said:
I know an Ash standing
called Yggdrasill,
A high tree sprinkled
with snow-white clay;
Thence come the dews
in the dale that fall--
It stands ever green
above Urdr's Well.
That dew which falls from it onto the earth is called by men honey-dew, and thereon are bees nourished. Two fowls are fed in Urdr's Well: they are called Swans, and from those fowls has come the race of birds which is so called."

Snorri furthermore informs the reader that the youngest norn, Skuld, is in effect also a valkyrie, taking part in the selection of warriors from the slain:
These are called Valkyrs: them Odin sends to every battle; they determine men's feyness and award victory. Gudr and Róta and the youngest Norn, she who is called Skuld, ride ever to take the slain and decide fights.

Legendary sagas
Some of the legendary sagas also contain references to the norns. The Hervarar saga contains a poem named Hlöðskviða, where the Gothic king Angantýr defeats a Hunnish invasion led by his Hunnish half-brother Hlöðr. Knowing that his sister, the shieldmaiden Hervör, is one of the casualties, Angantýr looks at his dead brother and laments the cruelty of the norns:

In younger legendary sagas, such as Norna-Gests þáttr and Hrólfs saga kraka, the norns appear to have been synonymous with völvas (witches, female shamans). In Norna-Gests þáttr, where they arrive at the birth of the hero to shape his destiny, the norns are not described as weaving the web of fate, instead Norna appears to be interchangeable and possibly a synonym of vala (völva).

One of the last legendary sagas to be written down, the Hrólfs saga kraka talks of the norns simply as evil witches. When the evil half-elven princess Skuld assembles her army to attack Hrólfr Kraki, it contains in addition to undead warriors, elves and norns.

Runic inscription N 351 M

The belief in the norns as bringers of both gain and loss would last beyond Christianization, as testifies the runic inscription N 351 M from the Borgund stave church:
Þórir carved these runes on the eve of Olaus-mass, when he travelled past here. The norns did both good and evil, great toil ... they created for me.

Franks Casket
Three women carved on the right panel of Franks Casket, an Anglo-Saxon whalebone chest from the eighth century, have been identified by some scholars as being three norns.

Theories
A number of theories have been proposed regarding the norns.

Matres and Matrones
The Germanic Matres and Matrones, female deities venerated in North-West Europe from the 1st to the 5th century AD depicted on votive objects and altars almost entirely in groups of three from the first to the fifth century AD have been proposed as connected with the later Germanic dísir, valkyries, and norns, potentially stemming from them.

Three norns
Theories have been proposed that there is no foundation in Norse mythology for the notion that the three main norns should each be associated exclusively with the past, the present, and the future; rather, all three represent destiny as it is twined with the flow of time. Moreover, theories have been proposed that the idea that there are three main norns may be due to a late influence from Greek and Roman mythology, where there are also spinning fate goddesses (Moirai and Parcae).

In popular culture 

The Norns are the main characters of the popular manga and anime Oh My Goddess!. Verðandi (here named Belldandy because of Japanese transliteration) is the female protagonist of the series. Her older sister Urðr (Urd) and her younger sister Skuld are important supporting characters in the story.

Amon Amarth wrote a death metal album entitled Fate of Norns, released in 2004 and containing the title track "Fate of Norns".

Jack and Annie meet the Norns on one of their missions in Magic Tree House.

In the video game Shin Megami Tensei: Devil Children 2, known in North America as Demikids, features the Norns individually as keepers of time and are recruitable demons in the post-game. If all are collected, they can be fused together to make a singular powerful demon known as "Norn" which shares traits from the three individual demons that make her up and has access to all three elements that her individual parts possess.

Norns are present in Philip K. Dick's "Galactic Pot-Healer", as entities keeping a book where the future is already written.

In Neil Gaiman's novel American Gods, Norns are shown as three women (one very tall, one average height, the last a dwarf) who assist Shadow in his vigil for Wednesday (Odin) on the ash tree, then stay in a croft nearby; they revive Shadow's dead wife Laura by means of the water from the pit of Urd; and they prophesy to Mr. Town, an associate of Mr. World, that his neck will be broken.

The Norns appear in Kieron Gillen and Jamie McKelvie's 2014-2018 comic book The Wicked + The Divine.

The Norns are alluded to in 2018's God of War, the eighth installment in the God of War series, developed by Santa Monica Studio and published by Sony Interactive Entertainment (SIE), which began the franchise's foray into the lore of Norse mythology. As the story's protagonist Kratos and his young son, Atreus, set off on a journey through the realm of Midgard, they continuously encounter chests known as Nornir Chest, each of which can be opened by locating three hidden rune-seals and quickly striking all three with the Leviathan Axe. Each of the Nornir Chests contain collectibles that gradually upgrade Kratos’ Health and/or Rage meters. In 2022's God of War Ragnarok, Kratos, Freya, and Mimir's head traveled to the Norns in order to know what Atreus is doing in Asgard. They managed to reach the Norns and find out that Heimdall (Watchman of Asgard) is planing to kill Atreus. Unlike with the Moirai that are encountered in God of War II, the player does not battle the Norns. 

The popular MMO Guild Wars 2 has a race of Viking themed people called norn; their story and entymology take inspiration from Viking mythology and cultures.

See also
 Deities and fairies of fate in Slavic mythology
 Hecate
 Matrones
 Moirai (the Greek Fates)
 Norn9
 Parcae (the Roman Fates)
 Valkyries
 Weird Sisters (Anglo-Saxon Fates or prophetesses)

Citations

General and cited references 

 
 Bek-Pedersen, Karen (2011). The Norns in Old Norse Mythology. Dunedin Academic Press. .
 The Elder Edda: A Book of Viking Lore.(2011). translated by Andy Orchard. Penguin Classics. .
 Lindow, John (2001). Norse Mythology: A Guide to the Gods, Heroes, Rituals, and Beliefs. Oxford University Press. .
 Lionarons, Joyce Tally (2005). "Dísir, Valkyries, Völur, and Norns: The Weise Frauen of the Deutsche Mythologie," in The Shadow Walkers: Jacob Grimm's Mythology of the Monstrous. ed. Tom Shippey. Arizona Center for Medieval and Renaissance Studies. 
 Simek, Rudolf (2007), translated by Angela Hall. Dictionary of Northern Mythology. D.S. Brewer. .
 Sturluson, Snorri (1995), translated by Anthony Faulkes. Edda. J.M. Dent. .

External links

 
Female supernatural figures in Norse mythology
Gýgjar
Textiles in folklore
Time and fate goddesses
Triple goddesses